The Fitchburg Art Museum (FAM) is a regional art museum based in Fitchburg, Worcester County, Massachusetts, United States.

Description
The Fitchburg Art Museum serves the cities of Fitchburg and Leominster, as well as the surrounding communities in North Central Massachusetts and Southern New Hampshire. FAM was founded in 1925 through a bequest of artist, collector, and educator Eleanor Norcross. The museum was designed by Mary Almy.

Collection strengths include American photography and general African art, including Ancient Egyptian art. The Egyptian collection is presented in an interactive gallery designed for families and school groups.

In 2012, FAM began its rotating contemporary New England artist exhibition program, thus connecting the strength of its historical collections with contemporary art practices.  There is also an annual survey show featuring the recent work of many living New England artists, including numerous artworks for sale. Each temporary exhibition is accompanied by an interactive educational exhibit in the Learning Lounge, where visitors young and old can learn about what they are seeing in the galleries and better understand their own reactions to the exhibits.

Bilingual Initiative

FAM is continuing to work towards a goal of becoming New England’s first fully bilingual (English/Spanish) art museum. Going forward, all new permanent collection displays, changing exhibitions, and associated in-gallery education spaces will be accompanied by bilingual educational texts and object labels. FAM has also hired a bilingual receptionist, and offers free admission to all its neighbors in Fitchburg’s Ward 4B, a predominantly Latino neighborhood. As FAM continues to build this program over the next few years, the Museum will seek to add bilingual printed collateral, website, social media, and docent tours. FAM is assisted in this effort by a local Latino Community Advisory Committee, and by the Cleghorn Neighborhood Association, the primary service organization for Fitchburg’s Latino and Latino Immigrant communities.
 
This Bilingual Museum Initiative stems from FAM’s goal to become one of best community museums in the US. In Fitchburg, 39% of the current population is Latino (primarily from Puerto Rico, the Dominican Republic, and Uruguay), and 55% of children enrolled in the Fitchburg Public Schools come from homes where Spanish is the primary language. This demographic is growing, and far exceeds both Massachusetts and national percentages for Latino population. The Fitchburg Art Museum intends to serve everyone in Fitchburg, and has embarked on the Bilingual Museum Initiative to provide cultural and educational enrichment to all.

External links 

 Fitchburg Art Museum website
 Eleanor Norcross and the museum
 Fitchburg Art Museum and Baptist Church

Art museums established in 1925
Museums in Worcester County, Massachusetts
Art museums and galleries in Massachusetts
1925 establishments in Massachusetts
Egyptological collections in the United States
Museums of ancient Greece in the United States
Museums of ancient Rome in the United States